The superficial palmar arch is accompanied by a pair of venae comitantes which constitute the superficial palmar venous arch. It receives the veins corresponding to the branches of the superficial arterial arch: the common palmar digital veins.

References 

Veins of the upper limb